Jeff Stock (born August 1, 1960 in Baltimore, Maryland) is a retired U.S. soccer defender who spent five seasons in the North American Soccer League and two in the Western Soccer Alliance.  He also played in the Major Indoor Soccer League with the Tacoma Stars.

Youth
Stock, son of major league baseball pitcher Wes Stock, attended Stadium High School, graduating in 1978.  While in high school, he played baseball.  However, he also played with future Sounders team mate Mark Peterson on the Norpoint Royals youth club.  UCLA offered Stock an athletic scholarship, but he elected to sign a professional soccer contract instead.

Professional
Stock signed with the Seattle Sounders of the North American Soccer League in 1978.  He spent both that season and the next on the reserve team under Jimmy Gabriel before breaking into the first team in 1980.  That season, he became a regular left back in the Sounders’ defensive scheme, seeing time in 23 games and scoring one goal.  This put him in competition for Rookie of the Year against team mate Mark Peterson and fellow Tacoma area youth defender Jeff Durgan, now playing with the New York Cosmos all of whom played with the Norpoint Royals youth soccer team out of Browns Point, Wa.  While Durgan won the award, Stock continued to excel with the Sounders, playing 35 games in both the 1981 and 1982 seasons.  In 1983, Stock lost most of the season after blowing out his right knee in the Sounders' fifth game.  The Sounders folded at the end of the season and the San Jose Earthquakes selected Stock in the dispersal draft in anticipation of the following indoor season.  However, his knee injury kept out of the line up until the last few games of the season.  The Earthquakes then traded him to the Vancouver Whitecaps.  In 1984, he played in 20 games.  That year the Whitecaps also competed in the F.C. Seattle Challenge ‘84.  The host team, F.C. Seattle, later change its name to the F.C. Seattle Storm, a team Stock joined in 1987.  On October 20, 1984, the Whitecaps released Stock.  He then went on trial with the Tacoma Stars of the Major Indoor Soccer League, but he aggravated his knee injury and was forced to sit out a year after having arthroscopic surgery.  In October 1985, Stock with the Tacoma Stars.  By this time knee injuries had begun to hinder Stock and the hard surface of an indoor soccer arena exacerbated the problems leading him to retire in December 1986.  On March 4, 1987, Stock returned to outdoor soccer with the F.C. Seattle Storm of the Western Soccer Alliance as a player/assistant coach.  The move back to the grass of an outdoor soccer field helped extend his career by a few years.  In 1988, he was selected to the Western Soccer Alliance All-Star team.  He also served as an assistant coach in both 1987 and 1988.  However, his knees finally gave and in 1989 he retired from playing professionally to devote himself to coaching.

National team
While never called up to the senior national team, Stock saw time with the U.S. U-19 team.  He then went on to play for the U.S. Pan American Games team as well as for the U.S. soccer team which qualified for the 1980 Summer Olympics in Moscow.  Unfortunately for Stock and his team mates, President Jimmy Carter chose to boycott the games in response to the Soviet invasion of Afghanistan.

Post soccer career
After retiring from soccer, Stock entered the real estate market, going on to buy two theme parks, Wild Waves and Enchanted Village.  Stock with 50% partner Michael Moodenbaugh purchased the two parks from Byron Betts in 1992 for $8 million.  Eight years later, he sold the two parks, now merged into one for $19.2 million. Stock took over management of the park in 2011 for the owners CNL Lifestyle Properties of Orlando, Stock has been a continuous owner of the land the park is located on.

Since then Stock has founded the "Coffee Cup" a local college soccer tournament.

References

External links
 Newspaper bio with several links
 North American Soccer League and Major Indoor Soccer League statistics

1960 births
Living people
American soccer players
Seattle Storm (soccer) players
Major Indoor Soccer League (1978–1992) players
North American Soccer League (1968–1984) indoor players
North American Soccer League (1968–1984) players
Soccer players from Tacoma, Washington
San Jose Earthquakes (1974–1988) players
Seattle Sounders (1974–1983) players
Tacoma Stars players
Vancouver Whitecaps (1974–1984) players
Western Soccer Alliance players
Association football defenders
Footballers at the 1979 Pan American Games
Pan American Games competitors for the United States